Víctor Hugo Osorio Reyes (born 27 October 1965) is a Chilean journalist and politician who served as minister during the second government of Michelle Bachelet (2014–2018).

References

1965 births
Living people
Pedro de Valdivia University alumni
21st-century Chilean politicians
People from Santiago
Government ministers of Chile
Citizen Left politicians
Progressive Party (Chile) politicians